The Proskurov pogrom took place on 15 February 1919 in the town of Proskurov (now Khmelnytskyi) during the Ukrainian War of Independence, which was taken over from under the Bolshevik control by militants who claimed themselves to be Haidamacks. In mere three and a half hours at least 1,500 Jews were murdered, up to 1,700 by other estimates, and more than 1,000 wounded including women, children and the old. The massacre was carried out by Ukrainian People's Republic soldiers of Ivan Samosenko. They were ordered to save the ammunition in the process and use only lances and bayonets.

One witness writing of the violence said "It is impossible to image what happened here on Saturday, February 15, 1919. This was not a pogrom. It was like the Armenian slaughter."

History
According to historians Yonah Alexander and Kenneth Myers the soldiers marched into the centre of town accompanied by a military band and engaged in atrocities under the slogan: "Kill the Jews, and save the Ukraine." The pogrom was initiated by Ivan Samosenko following a failed Bolshevik uprising against the Ukrainian People's Republic in the city.

The mention of pogrom was brought up during the Schwartzbard's trial in Paris, France. Reportedly, the evidential proof of an order by Ukrainian People's Republic head Symon Petliura himself was discussed during the proceedings. The actual cable was burned by a Jew fearing death. According to Canadian historian Henry Abramson the cable is probably a forgery "Given the repeated publications condemned by Petliura of pogroms".  1

A few days later, the Red Cross representative in Proskurow witnessed Semosenko's verbal report to Petliura, admitting to killing 4,000 Jews, which nevertheless remained unconfirmed. The town of Proskurov was renamed Khmelnytskyi in 1954 during the Stalinist era, in spite of the fact that Bohdan Khmelnytsky himself committed a terrible pogrom there against the Jews already in the 17th century.

Notes

Sources

1919 in Ukraine
Antisemitism in Ukraine
Anti-Jewish pogroms of the Russian Civil War
February 1919 events
Khmelnytskyi, Ukraine
Mass murder in 1919